The Gardens is a suburb of Auckland, New Zealand. It is located to the north of Manurewa East, east of Wiri and south of Totara Heights. It was formerly under the local governance of Manukau City Council until it was merged with all of Auckland's councils to form the Auckland 'super city' in 2010. It is now under the local governance of Auckland Council.

Auckland Botanic Gardens are on the west side of the suburb.

Demographics

The Gardens had a population of 3,909 at the 2018 New Zealand census, an increase of 438 people (12.6%) since the 2013 census, and an increase of 837 people (27.2%) since the 2006 census. There were 1,107 households, comprising 1,899 males and 2,007 females, giving a sex ratio of 0.95 males per female. The median age was 37.8 years (compared with 37.4 years nationally), with 777 people (19.9%) aged under 15 years, 789 (20.2%) aged 15 to 29, 1,875 (48.0%) aged 30 to 64, and 465 (11.9%) aged 65 or older.

Ethnicities were 52.1% European/Pākehā, 9.4% Māori, 10.7% Pacific peoples, 37.9% Asian, and 3.4% other ethnicities. People may identify with more than one ethnicity.

The percentage of people born overseas was 39.9, compared with 27.1% nationally.

Although some people chose not to answer the census's question about religious affiliation, 36.6% had no religion, 35.5% were Christian, 0.2% had Māori religious beliefs, 8.1% were Hindu, 2.2% were Muslim, 2.7% were Buddhist and 9.0% had other religions.

Of those at least 15 years old, 840 (26.8%) people had a bachelor's or higher degree, and 417 (13.3%) people had no formal qualifications. The median income was $41,200, compared with $31,800 nationally. 780 people (24.9%) earned over $70,000 compared to 17.2% nationally. The employment status of those at least 15 was that 1,794 (57.3%) people were employed full-time, 411 (13.1%) were part-time, and 87 (2.8%) were unemployed.

Education

References

Suburbs of Auckland